Second Captains is an Irish media company established in March 2013 by Eoin McDevitt, Ken Early, Mark Horgan, Ciarán Murphy and Simon Hick. Best-known for their podcast The Second Captains World Service, the company specialises in television, radio and online production and currently broadcasts from their Dublin studios. 

Second Captains was the first major radio show to move from traditional programming to podcasting in Ireland[2] and remains the most popular podcast ever produced in Ireland.

The company has produced five series of the IFTA-nominated Second Captains Live for RTÉ 2 television and also produces and presents radio shows for RTÉ Radio 1. It has hosted TV shows and live events in the UK, San Francisco, New York, and all over Ireland.

The five-man team previously produced and presented the Off The Ball show on Newstalk national radio station for nine years, garnering numerous PPI radio awards.[3] They left their Newstalk jobs in early March 2013. Their departure caused major ripples in the Irish media industry[4][5][6][7] and they had to see out a period of gardening leave (contractually prevented from working for another station due to the nature of their departure from Newstalk),[8] during which there was great speculation about what their next move would be.[9][10]

Podcasts

The Second Captains Podcast began on 14 May 2013 in conjunction with The Irish Times. The show quickly became the most popular podcast in Ireland, winning the iTunes podcast of the year in 2014. In 2015, the podcast was chosen as one of the top ten British and Irish podcasts of all time as part of the iTunes Essentials list and it was selected as one of The Guardian’s 50 best podcasts of 2016. It remains Ireland’s most-listened-to podcast.

Second Captains expanded its online shows in February 2017 and launched The Second Captains World Service podcast feed available only to Second Captains' members. The Player's Chair Podcast hosted Richie Sadlier and Ken Early's Political Podcast were added to the roster of programming. The commercial-free, subscriber-based model had over 10,000 members after 12 months.

Regular guests include Shane Horgan, Richie Sadlier, Oisín McConville and Brian Murphy from San Francisco's KNBR radio station, who speaks weekly on US sports.

In March 2018, Second Captains celebrated their fifth birthday with interviews with Ken Loach, Vincent Browne, Lynne Cox, Michael Chieka and Paul Kimmage. 

PBESO, pronounced "pee-bezzo" and short for "Pierce Brosnan's Emigrant Shout-Outs", is a regular slot on the show. During the slot, input from listeners around the globe is sought and broadcast, with emigrants contacting the program with stories of their travels and missing home. 

Second Captains Live

In August 2013, three months after the podcasts began, Second Captains made a not-for-broadcast pilot for RTÉ television. Soon after, they were commissioned for a four-show run on RTÉ2 in September/October 2013. The first broadcast was scheduled on 10
September 2013, to coincide with a vital World Cup qualifying match in Vienna between Ireland and Austria, going on immediately after the live coverage of the game. Thereafter the show reverted to Wednesday nights. Second Captains Live was enthusiastically received by audiences, the Irish Independent calling it "sports broadcasting of the highest quality"[11] and the Irish Times describing it as "ridiculously fabulous".[12]

Format

Second Captains Live is hosted by Eoin McDevitt, with Ken Early and Ciarán Murphy sharing co-hosting duties. Mark Horgan is the series producer, with Simon Hick acting as producer and making some on-screen appearances. The show is divided into three parts: the first part is a panel discussion between three current or former sports stars on a particular topic broadly analogous to the big news of that week and touching on their own experiences; the second part is an interview with a main guest (e.g. Ronan O'Gara on episode 1); and the third part is a quiz between one of the guests and Murphy, called Challenge Second Captains, playing on Ciaran's previous experiences of competing on old RTÉ school quiz-shows Blackboard Jungle and Gridlock. The show is influenced by Fantasy Football League, TFI Friday and Nighthawks.[13] The show is shot completely live in front of a studio audience, and in between the interviews, RTÉ archive is used extensively, often for comedic purposes. It is described on the RTÉ website as "the place in Irish television where sport meets entertainment".[14] Second Captains Live is directed by Maurice Linnane, whose work also includes the popular music program Other Voices.

Guests

Guests on series one included O'Gara, Sonia O'Sullivan, Colm Cooper, Mark Rohan, Derval O'Rourke, Jerry Flannery, Dónal Óg Cusack and staples from the podcasts such as Horgan, Sadlier and McConville. Series two of the show began on 12 March 2014 and guests included Neil Lennon and Six Nations winners Joe Schmidt and Gordon D'Arcy, as well as Pádraig Harrington, Niall Quinn and Peter Canavan. Series three featured [[Henry Shefflin, Graeme Souness, Paul McGrath, Anthony Daly, Paul Galvin, Kieran Donaghy, Anthony Tohill amongst others. Brian O'Driscoll, Ciarán McDonald, Johnny Sexton, Luke Fitzgerald, Andy Lee and Liam Brady were the main guests on series four. Series five featured, among others, Jim McGuinness, Barry McGuigan, Noel McGrath, Richie Hogan, [[Tony Cascarino and Kevin Moran.

The Good Wall

The Good Wall is a feature on the show where the top ten Irish sportspeople of all-time are chosen by Second Captains contributors. Each week, the program's major guests can make one change to the existing wall and introduce a new sportsperson to the top ten. O'Gara made a stir when he removed former teammate O'Driscoll from the top spot in show one. O'Sullivan subsequently removed Irish golfer Pádraig Harrington from the wall entirely.[15]

Name

The name Second Captains comes from a press conference exchange Ken Early once had with then-Ireland football manager Steve Staunton. Commenting on the return of experienced goalkeeper Shay Given to the starting team, Early asked Staunton if it was "almost like having a second captain on the team." Staunton paused for a moment and then said - "Pffft... second captain, first captain, whatever."[6]

References 

Mass media companies of Ireland
Irish podcasters
Irish YouTubers
Patreon creators